This is a list of articles about terms of service and privacy policies. These are also called terms of use, and are rules one must agree to, in order to use a service. The articles fall in two main categories: descriptions of terms used for specific companies or products, and descriptions of different kinds of terms in general. Articles on companies vary widely in the amount of detail they give on terms of service. Annotations show what is available in the article on each company, and need to be updated as those articles are improved.

Terms of service are regularly the subject of news articles throughout the English-language press, such as in the US, UK, Africa, India, Singapore, and Australia. Terms of service are also addressed in a widely reviewed documentary, academic research, and legal research.

Articles which describe specific companies' terms of service

Social media
Comparison: Privacy concerns with social networking services – Partially compares privacy policies, data retention, geo-tagging, data releases
Comparison: Comparison of Q&A sites – Compares topics allowed, copyright, and licensing of user contributions
Comparison: Death and the Internet - Compares rules on access after death
Facebook Addresses privacy settings and enforcement
Instagram Partly addresses commercial re-use of members' posts, and geo-tagging
Pinterest Addresses sales of user data and tracking of users on other websites which have a Pinterest button
Tencent Partly addresses user security
Twitter Addresses privacy, data dissemination, security breaches, legal jurisdiction, deletion to comply with national laws and survivors' requests

Search engines
Comparison: Privacy-focused search engines/browsers – Partially compares location of servers and hiding IP addresses
DuckDuckGo Addresses lack of tracking
Google Addresses privacy and indemnification

Browsers
Comodo Dragon Addresses arbitration, tracking, disclosures, liability, and use of the information for advertising
Google Chrome Addresses tracking of users, and insecurity with VPNs
Safari Addresses tracking, disclaimers, and disclosing unique device identifiers "for any purpose"

Transport
Comparison: Credit card damage waivers – Compares credit cards' limits on rental car damages
Comparison: Diminution in value – Compares rental car companies' terms about charging for diminution in value
Air passengers and freight Montreal Convention 119 states and the EU; Warsaw Convention 152 states
Road freight: CMR Convention Europe and Asia; Uniform Bill of Lading Act USA
Sea freight Hague–Visby Rules applied in US by the Carriage of Goods by Sea Act;  newer are Hamburg Rules and Rotterdam Rules
Trains in Europe (CIV) Partly addresses guarantee of arrival and connections, baggage, compensation
Trains in UK National Rail Conditions of Travel Addresses compensation for delays; links to other issues
Lyft Addresses indemnification (user payment of company's legal bills)
Southwest Airlines Partly addresses difficulties beyond the airline's control
Uber Addresses indemnification (user payment of company's legal bills)

Credit cards
American Express Addresses limits on rental car damages
Discover Addresses limits on rental car damages
Mastercard Addresses limits on rental car damages
Visa Partly addresses terms imposed on merchants, and limits on rental car damages

Email
Comparison: Death and the Internet - Compares rules on access after death

Utility software
CCleaner Addresses tracking of users and their software, matching with outside sources of information, use of the information for advertising, data retention, liability
GeForce (graphics processing units from Nvidia) Addresses liability, and user data provided to Nvidia, to social media and to advertisers
Malwarebytes Addresses arbitration, tracking of users and all software they run, their clickstreams, locations, data retention, and use of the information for advertising
Microsoft account (formerly Passport or Live ID) Partly addresses privacy and allegations of deceptive practices

Other software
Comparison: List of commercial software with available source code – Compares copyright, open source, copyright licensing
Comparison: List of commercial video games with available source code – Compares copyright licensing

Online file storage and hosting
Comparison: Comparison of file hosting services - Compares limits on size, bandwidth, expiration
Comparison: Comparison of online backup services - Compares limits on size, bandwidth, server locations, security key management
Comparison: Comparison of free and open-source software licenses
Comparison: Death and the Internet - Compares rules on access after death
Amazon Drive Addresses file sizes and commercial use
Baidu Wangpan Partly addresses country of storage
Dropbox Partly addresses privacy, ownership of data and deletion
Google Drive Partly addresses privacy and intellectual property
ICloud Partly addresses encryption
OneDrive Partly addresses privacy and usage prohibitions
SpiderOak Partly addresses encryption
SecureSafe Addresses digital inheritance
Tresorit Addresses encryption

Website hosts
Comparison: Comparison of free blog hosting services – Compares limits on size, bandwidth, e-commerce
Google Sites Addresses limits on file sizes, e-commerce, scripting, countries
Jimdo Addresses limits on e-commerce, languages, location of data storage
Tripod Addresses storage, e-commerce, scripting
Weebly Partly addresses storage, e-commerce
Wix.com Partly addressed e-commerce
WordPress.com Partly addresses ads, paid upgrades
Yola Partly addresses limits on storage, web pages

Broad comparisons across categories
Death and the Internet – Compares terms on retention and access after an account holder dies
Indemnity – requirements that users pay companies' legal bills

Articles which discuss terms of service in general
Acceptable use policy
Click wrap
Contract of carriage
Community standards
Disclaimer
Email privacy
End-user license agreement
Free license
Free software license
Free web hosting service
Internet privacy
License compatibility
Multi-licensing
Open-source license
Privacy concerns with social networking services
Privacy policy
Proprietary software
Public domain equivalent license
Service-level agreement
Shrink wrap contract
Site license
Software license
Standard form contract
Terms and Conditions May Apply
Terms of service
Terms of Service; Didn't Read
Unfair Contract Terms Act 1977

References

Computer law
Contract law
Information technology management
Internet law
Software licenses
Terms of service
Companies' terms of service
Wikipedia indexes
Online services comparisons